Michael Barnwell Silliman (May 5, 1944 – June 16, 2000) was an American professional basketball player. He was born in Louisville, Kentucky.

Silliman was a 6'6" forward from West Point, where he played for coach Bob Knight and took Army to the NIT Semi-Finals in 1964, 1965, and 1966. He participated in the 1968 Summer Olympics and won a gold medal as captain of the United States national basketball team. He also played for the United States men's national basketball team at the 1967 FIBA World Championship and the 1970 FIBA World Championship. He later played one season (1970–71) with the Buffalo Braves of the National Basketball Association. Silliman scored 91 points in 36 NBA games.

Silliman had 55 scholarship offers coming out of St. Xavier High School in Kentucky. He was Army's all-time leading scorer at the time of his 1966 graduation and now stands 10th in Academy history with 1,342 points. A three-year basketball letter winner and All-American, Silliman netted more than 1,000 points without the benefit of the three-point line and without the shot clock to speed up shooting.  In addition to his career averages of a double-double with 19.7 points per game and 11.5 rebounds per game, Silliman was also an Academic All-American.

Silliman also earned three letters in baseball while at West Point. He was a member of the 1966 team that finished 16-4 and won its second straight Eastern Intercollegiate Baseball League championship.

Silliman was inducted into the Army Sport Hall of Fame in 2008.  His jersey (#20) was retired by West Point in January, 2015. Army is the fourth Hall of Fame to induct Silliman, joining the Kentucky Athletic, the Kentucky High School Athletic Association and St. Xavier's.

Bob Knight has said on several occasions that Silliman is the best college player he's ever coached.

Silliman died of a heart attack at age 56 in 2000. He is interred at Calvary Cemetery in Louisville, Kentucky.

References

External links

1968 Summer Olympics at USABasketball.com

1944 births
2000 deaths
Amateur Athletic Union men's basketball players
Army Black Knights men's basketball players
Basketball players at the 1967 Pan American Games
Basketball players at the 1968 Summer Olympics
Basketball players from Louisville, Kentucky
Buffalo Braves players
Medalists at the 1968 Summer Olympics
New York Knicks draft picks
Olympic gold medalists for the United States in basketball
Pan American Games gold medalists for the United States
Pan American Games medalists in basketball
Parade High School All-Americans (boys' basketball)
Small forwards
United States men's national basketball team players
American men's basketball players
Medalists at the 1967 Pan American Games
1970 FIBA World Championship players
1967 FIBA World Championship players